Noke may be:

 Noke (worms), a Māori term for earthworms
 Noke, Oxfordshire, a village in Oxfordshire, England
 Billy Noke (born 1963), Australian rugby footballer
 Charles Noke (1858–1941), English pottery designer and artist
 Kyle Noke (born 1980), Australian professional mixed martial artist
 Tikiko Noke (born 1994), Fijian rugby league footballer

See also
 Nokes (disambiguation)